Byron Junior Harrison (born 15 June 1987) is an English professional footballer who plays as a striker for Nantwich Town on a dual registration basis from Altrincham.

Career

Early career
Harrison began his football career with Conference South side Havant & Waterlooville in 2005, having been recommended to the club by former player Darren Annon. He made his debut for Havant in October 2005, coming on as a substitute in the 70th minute in a game away at Farnborough Town. A week later, he scored his first professional goal, scoring twenty minutes after coming on a substitute in Havant's FA Cup tie against Cirencester Town. In November 2005, Harrison was on the scoresheet again, this time in an FA Trophy game against Weymouth. Harrison continued to make sporadic substitute appearances throughout the season. He left Havant at the end of the 2005–06 campaign, having made 22 appearances, all of which were from the substitute's bench. The club kept the door open to Harrison, and offered him the opportunity to come back in a years time after he had played more first-team football.

Harrison started the 2006–07 season playing for Worthing of the Isthmian League Premier Division, having signed for the club on a free transfer in July 2006. He left Worthing in November 2006, and subsequently signed for Boreham Wood. Harrison made his Boreham Wood debut in December 2006, coming on as a substitute in a 4–1 win at Folkestone Invicta. After his debut, Boreham Wood manager Steve Cook said "Byron is very young and enthusiastic and I have a gut feeling about him". In January 2007, Harrison suffered a leg injury that ruled him out for six weeks. On his return from injury, on 3 March, Harrison scored his first goals for the club, a hat-trick against his former employers, Worthing, in a 3–2 win at Meadow Park. He added another goal to his tally in a 2–0 away win at Margate, as well as scoring successive braces in away victories at Hendon and Slough Town. Harrison ended the 2006–07 season as Boreham Wood's top goalscorer, having scored 13 times in 21 appearances.

Harrison stayed at Boreham Wood ahead of the 2007–08 season. In September 2007, having failed to find the net once, he was demoted to the substitute's bench for Boreham Wood's game against Harlow Town. On Harrison's omission, manager Steve Cook said "Byron has been a little subdued of late, although I told him I do not expect him to be out of the team for long". Despite making several starting appearances, Harrison failed to find the net once during the first two months of the 2007–08 season. He was released by Boreham Wood on 30 October 2007.

Ashford Town (Middlesex)
Following a short spell at Harrow Borough, Harrison signed for Ashford Town (Middlesex) in January 2008, making his debut in a match against Kingstonian. He scored his first goal for the club in February 2008, scoring the winning goal in a 2–1 win against his former club, Boreham Wood.

During the first half of the 2009–10 season, Harrison scored 19 times for Ashford. As a result of his goalscoring form, he had a trial period with Southend United in February 2010. He played in a reserve fixture for Southend against Colchester United, but failed to earn a contract with the club. Had his trial at Southend been successful, Ashford would have been entitled to £20,000 compensation. A week later after his trial with Southend, Harrison left his parent club, Ashford
. On leaving Ashford, he had an unsuccessful trial with Premier League club Wolverhampton Wanderers, and also attracted the interest of Conference South club Staines Town, who had previously tried to sign Harrison on two separate occasions. During his two-year spell at Ashford, Harrison scored a total of 53 goals in all competitions.

Carshalton Athletic
In March 2010, Harrison signed for Isthmian League Premier Division club Carshalton Athletic, rejecting contract offers from Staines Town and Margate respectively. On signing Harrison, Carshalton manager Mark Butler said "He was a player that I went out and targeted as I really wanted to get him to this club. I know what he is capable". Harrison made his debut for Carshalton in a 0–0 home draw against Hendon, a game in which he hit the crossbar in the second-half. He scored his first goal for the club in a 1–1 draw away at Margate, and also scored in Carshalton's 2–2 home draw with Harrow Borough in April 2010. Harrison's hat-trick on the final day of the season in a 4–1 away win at Wealdstone meant that Carshalton stayed up, thus relegating his former club Ashford.

Harrison remained at Carshalton ahead of the 2010–11 season, and scored on the opening day of the season with "an impressive strike from outside the area" in a 2–0 win over Lowestoft Town. Harrison scored back–to–back FA Cup hat-tricks against East Thurrock United and Braintree Town, taking his 2010–11 goal tally to twelve. He scored his last goal for Carshalton in the club's 4–2 home loss to Concord Rangers, and played his last game in a 2–0 home loss to Sutton United on 27 December 2010. He scored a total of 14 goals during the first half of the 2010–11 season, making 25 appearances.

Stevenage
Harrison signed for Stevenage in January 2011 on a free transfer and was handed the number 26 shirt. As part of the deal, Carshalton played host to Stevenage in a friendly in July 2011. Harrison played his first game for the club shortly after, starting in Stevenage's 1–0 away loss to Gillingham. He scored his first goal for Stevenage in the club's 3–0 home win against Rotherham United on 25 January 2011, scoring just three minutes after coming on as a substitute to give Stevenage a two-goal lead. A week later, in his next game, Harrison scored twice in Stevenage's 2–2 draw with Gillingham. Harrison scored his fourth goal in as many games in another 2–2 draw, scoring the first goal of the game against Accrington Stanley with a looping shot from outside the area. He scored his fifth goal for the club in Stevenage's 1–0 away win at Crewe Alexandra. The goal had initially been credited to Stevenage left back Scott Laird, but it was later announced that the ball had gone in off of Harrison's back. Harrison made it seven goals in eleven games after scoring two goals against Cheltenham Town on 26 February 2011. His eighth goal of the season came in the club's 2–2 home draw against Aldershot Town, with Harrison prodding Luke Foster's shot into the goal to earn Stevenage a point. Similarly to Harrison's goal against Crewe, the goal was originally given to another Stevenage player, this time Foster being credited with the goal, but the goal was officially given to Harrison a week later. Harrison finished the season as joint top goalscorer for Stevenage with eight goals in 23 appearances. This included three substitute appearances in the 2010–11 League Two play-offs following Stevenage's sixth-placed finish. After a 3–0 aggregate victory over Accrington Stanley, Stevenage earned promotion to League One courtesy of a 1–0 win against Torquay United at Old Trafford in the Final on 28 May 2011, with Harrison coming on as 62nd-minute substitute.

Harrison made his first appearance of the 2011–12 season in Stevenage's 0–0 home draw with Exeter City, coming on as a 70th-minute substitute. He scored his first goal of the season in the club's 2–2 draw against Hartlepool United on 20 August 2011, scoring Stevenage's first goal with a shot from six yards out. Harrison also scored in Stevenage's 2–1 away win against Bury on 29 October 2011, sweeping the ball past Cameron Belford from twelve yards after John Mousinho had headed the ball down. During his time at Stevenage, Harrison made 46 appearances in all competitions and scored ten goals.

AFC Wimbledon
Harrison signed for League Two side AFC Wimbledon on 10 January 2012, becoming the Don's record signing, joining for an undisclosed five-figure fee in excess of the £25,000 previously paid for Jon Main. He made his debut for the club in a 2–1 away victory at Port Vale on 14 January, assisting Luke Moore's goal late-on to ensure Wimbledon secured all three points. It took Harrison a while to adapt to the Dons' style, however, which may have attributed to Harrison's inability to get off the mark for the club. Having scored his first goals in Wimbledon colours against Metropolitan Police in the London Senior Cup, Harrison finally scored his first league goal for the club on his thirteenth appearance after coming on as a substitute in the Dons' 4–0 victory against Burton Albion on 24 March 2012. He also scored on the last day of the season, netting the first goal of the match as Wimbledon ran out 3–1 winners over already promoted Shrewsbury Town. The goal doubled Harrison's Wimbledon tally, having made 19 appearances for the club during the second half of the campaign.

He featured in AFC Wimbledon's first game of the 2012–13 season, coming on as a second-half substitute in a 3–1 League Cup defeat to his former employers, Stevenage. Harrison scored his first goal of the season in his next match, a 6–2 defeat to Burton Albion, again appearing from the substitute's bench. Four days later, on 25 August, he equalled his AFC Wimbledon goal tally for the previous season; scoring a late consolation goal courtesy of a header in a heavy defeat to Bradford City at Valley Parade. Harrison then made it three goals in as many matches when he volleyed in from a corner in AFC Wimbledon's 2–2 home draw with Dagenham Redbridge. He took his goal tally to seven for the season when he scored four goals in consecutive matches through October 2012. A month later, Harrison scored twice against York City within the space of two days; firstly scoring in a convincing 3–0 away win, before netting in a televised 4–3 FA Cup victory two days later. His last match for AFC Wimbledon was a 2–2 home draw with Port Vale on 24 January 2013. During his one-year spell with the club, he made 45 appearances and scored 10 goals.

Cheltenham Town
Harrison signed for League Two side Cheltenham Town on 31 January 2013. He joined the club for an undisclosed fee, and on a two-and-a-half-year contract. Cheltenham manager Mark Yates revealed that he had previously tried to sign Harrison on several occasions, including ahead of the 2012–13 season. Harrison made his debut for Cheltenham as a second-half substitute in the club's 2–1 home win over Torquay United on 2 February 2013. The opening months of his Cheltenham career were disrupted by a back injury, and as a result he appeared predominantly as a late substitute after signing for the club. Harrison scored his first goal for Cheltenham in a 3–1 away defeat to Burton Albion on 9 March 2013, in his ninth appearance, heading in a late consolation in injury-time.

Despite Cheltenham Town struggling in the 2013–14 season and carrying an injury in several games, as of 24 April 2014 Harrison had scored 15 goals in his first full season for the Robins, and had earned the praise of boss Mark Yates.

Chesterfield
On 27 January 2015, Harrison left Cheltenham Town after falling out of favour at the club. He signed for an undisclosed fee. He scored his first goal for Chesterfield against Bradford City on 31 March 2015. On 12 May 2016, Harrison was released by Chesterfield.

Barrow
Following his release, Harrison signed for non-league Barrow. He scored 32 goals in 67 appearances in all competitions for the Cumbrian side before joining Sutton United on loan in February 2018. He left Barrow at the end of the season.

Barnet
On 27 July 2018, Harrison signed for Barnet. After only two goals all season, he was released at the end of the season.

Return to Barrow
Harrison re-joined Barrow for the 2019–20 season on a one-year deal with an option for a further year. Following a promotion winning season, Harrison was released by the Cumbria club.

Altrincham
Harrison joined Altrincham on a short-term deal in December 2020. He was released after three months.

Connah's Quay Nomads
In May 2021 he moved to Cymru Premier side Connah's Quay Nomads leaving the club at the end of the 2021–22 season.

Boston United
On 3 September 2022 he joined Boston United on non-contract terms, leaving the club two weeks later having made two appearances.

Return to Altrincham
On 24 September 2022, Harrison returned to Altrincham on a short-term deal. In October 2022, Harrison signed for Nantwich Town on a dual-registration basis.

Career statistics

A.  The "League" column constitutes appearances and goals (including those as a substitute) in the Football League, Football Conference and Isthmian League Premier Division.
B.  The "Other" column constitutes appearances and goals (including those as a substitute) in the FA Trophy and play-offs.

Honours
Stevenage
 League Two play-offs: 2010–11
Barrow AFC
 National League: 2019–20

References

External links

 

1987 births
Living people
English footballers
Association football forwards
Havant & Waterlooville F.C. players
Worthing F.C. players
Boreham Wood F.C. players
Harrow Borough F.C. players
Ashford Town (Middlesex) F.C. players
Carshalton Athletic F.C. players
Stevenage F.C. players
AFC Wimbledon players
Cheltenham Town F.C. players
Chesterfield F.C. players
Barrow A.F.C. players
Sutton United F.C. players
Barnet F.C. players
Altrincham F.C. players
Boston United F.C. players
Nantwich Town F.C. players
English Football League players
National League (English football) players
Isthmian League players
Northern Premier League players
Connah's Quay Nomads F.C. players
Cymru Premier players